The 2008 200 km of Buenos Aires was the second edition of this race on the TC2000 season.
The race was held in the Autódromo Juan y Óscar Gálvez in Buenos Aires.

Report 

With more than 70.000 spectators attending the event, Argentina's José María López and Scotland's Anthony Reid won the 5th edition of the Buenos Aires 200 km, after a great initial stint by the local driver and a similarly impressive second one by the Scot. They used their huge talent, exploited other drivers' errors and also the performance of the New Civic of the Honda Petrobras team. The team's happiness was even greater because another of its cars placed second, in the hands of Juan Manuel Silva/Leonel Ugalde. Alain Menu/Christian Ledesma (Chevrolet Elaion) completed the podium.
Buenos Aires, August 10, 2008.- With more than 70.000 spectators attending the event, Argentina's José María López and Scotland's Anthony Reid won the 5th edition of the Buenos Aires 200 km, after a great initial stint by the local driver and a similarly impressive second one by the Scot. They used their huge talent, exploited other drivers' errors and also the performance of the New Civic of the Honda Petrobras team. The team's happiness was even greater because another of its cars placed second, in the hands of Juan Manuel Silva/Leonel Ugalde. Alain Menú/Christian Ledesma (Chevrolet Elaion) completed the podium.

This is a dream come true. It is the happiest day of my life. Tears came to my eyes because of all the work we did to achieve this result. It is Honda's victory. It is the team's victory. I suffered very much when I was not at the wheel of the car, it is very different. There were times in which I wanted him to go faster, to take it easier, but I did not want to influence what Anthony was doing at the wheel of the car. We formed a great driver pairing, sincerely", said López, full of emotion.

Pechito has become a specialist in the so-called special events this season, as he recently won on the Santa Fe street circuit and now he has won the Buenos Aires 200 km, the two most outstanding events so far this year. Not forgetting to mention the great performance of the Honda Petrobras team during the entire weekend, having been ahead of its rivals right from the onset.

This was also Anthony Reid's first victory in the division, and he has competed in all five editions which so far have taken place. He was second in last year's event, co-driving with Brazil's Carlos Bueno. "I've spent five years trying to win this race. Last year we were second. We've raced with Víctor Rosso in Japan, I know him very well and to be here is terrific. I also want to thank López for the great job he did today ... he should be in Formula 1." said the Scot.

López and Reid claimed victory thanks in part to the great job of the driver from Córdoba in what refers to the initial stint. After the driver change, when the Silva/Ugalde car grabbed the lead ahead of López/Reid, the Briton cautiously tried to find a way past Ugalde.

The latter found a good rhythm, but on lap 52 he overdid things while descending the Tobogan esses and lost the lead to Reid, who from then on controlled the race and headed towards victory, followed by Ugalde who kept Felipe Maluhy's Renault Mégane at bay. Maluhy was co-driving with standings leader Guillermo Ortelli.

It was Maluhy, who had finished 5th in the 2006 edition and 4th in 2007, who appeared to heading for the final podium placing until being nerfed by his countryman Cacá Bueno in the Ombú Curve and being demoted to fifth, as he was overtaken by Bueno and also by Alain Menú, who was co-driving a Chevrolet Astra with Christian Ledesma.

Once the race had ended, the Stewards handed out a 30-second penalty to Bueno and this relegated him to 10th, so the third step of the podium finally corresponded to Ledesma/Menú, while Ortelli/Maluhy ended up fourth, ahead of Matías Rossi/Thiago Camilo.

In this way, Switzerland's Alain Menú once again claimed a podium placing in the event, as he had done in his three previous outings in the Buenos Aires 200 km. He and Ledesma were the best-placed Chevrolet drivers. Teammates Bugliotti/Huff were sixth and Risatti/Orsi seventh.

It was not a good day for the works Ford YPF outfit, as Martín Basso retired early on in the race while in fourth, which meant that Omar Martinez did not get to race the Focus, The Gabriel Ponce de León/Walter Hernández pairing ended up 12th after engine trouble delayed them.

Results

References 

Buenos Aires 200km
Buenos Aires